Parliamentary elections were held in the Transkei Bantustan, South Africa on 23 October 1968. The Transkei National Independence Party  won 57 of the 75 elected seats.

Electoral system
The Legislative Assembly had a total of 109 seats, 45 of which were elected and 64 of which were reserved for directly and indirectly elected chiefs. Of the 64 seats reserved for chiefs, four were for Paramount chiefs and 60 for office-holding Chiefs in nine regions. 56 of the 64 Chiefs supported the ruling party.

Results

References

Transkei
Elections in Transkei
October 1968 events in Africa